Ulrich I may refer to:

 Ulrich I, Duke of Carinthia (died 1144)
 Ulrich I, Count of Württemberg (1226–1265)
 Ulrich I, Count of Celje  (1331-1368)
 Ulrich I, Duke of Mecklenburg-Stargard (before 1382–1417)
 Ulrich I, Count of East Frisia (1408–1466)